Convention and Exhibition Center is a large public building in Futian Central Business District, Shenzhen, China. It has held almost 300 exhibitions and more than 1350 conferences since its opening. It is built by the Shenzhen municipal government, and was designed by the German architectural firm Gerkan, Marg and Partners.

It remains a popular venue for international fairs and exhibitions. The 2018 China hi tech fair (CHTF) was held here in November 2018.

It lies on line 1 and line 4 of Shenzhen metro.

See also
Convention and Exhibition Center Station (Shenzhen), the Shenzhen Metro station serving the building and its surroundings

References

Tourist attractions in Shenzhen
Futian District